Matuszewski (feminine Matuszewska) is a Polish surname. It may refer to:

 Bolesław Matuszewski (1856-c. 1943), Polish photographer
 Ignacy Matuszewski (1891-1946), Polish politician
 Konrad Matuszewski, Polish footballer
 Marek Matuszewski (born 1959), Polish politician
 Richard Matuszewski (born 1964), American tennis player

Polish-language surnames